The 2014–15 MOL Liga season was the seventh season of the MOL Liga. The league is a multi-national ice hockey league consisting of teams from Hungary, Romania, and Slovakia. HC Nové Zámky are the defending Champions after defeating ASC Corona Braşov in the 2014 Championship.

Team information

Regular season

Standings

Playoff

See also 
 MOL Liga
 2014 in ice hockey
 2015 in ice hockey

References

External links
MOL Liga (official website)

2
MOL Liga
MOL Liga
Erste Liga (ice hockey) seasons